Sixto Rodrigo Ramírez Cardozo (born 29 July 1990) is a Paraguayan footballer who plays for 12 de Octubre.

He formerly played for Coquimbo Unido.

References

External links
 
 
 Sixto Ramírez at playmakerstats.com (English version of ceroacero.es)

1990 births
Living people
People from San Lorenzo, Paraguay
Paraguayan footballers
Paraguayan expatriate footballers
Association football defenders
Sportivo Luqueño players
Coquimbo Unido footballers
Club Nacional footballers
Ayacucho FC footballers
Deportivo Coopsol players
Deportivo Capiatá players
12 de Octubre Football Club players
Paraguayan Primera División players
Primera B de Chile players
Peruvian Primera División players
Peruvian Segunda División players
Paraguayan Segunda División players
Paraguayan expatriate sportspeople in Chile
Paraguayan expatriate sportspeople in Peru
Expatriate footballers in Chile
Expatriate footballers in Peru